A far-reaching anti-corruption campaign began in China following the conclusion of the 18th National Congress of the Chinese Communist Party (CCP) in 2012. The campaign, carried out under the aegis of Xi Jinping, General Secretary of the Chinese Communist Party, was the largest organized anti-corruption effort in the history of CCP rule in China.

Upon taking office, Xi vowed to crack down on "tigers and flies", that is, high-level officials and local civil servants alike.  Most of the officials investigated were removed from office and faced accusations of bribery and abuse of power, although the range of alleged abuses varied widely. The campaign 'netted' over 120 high-ranking officials, including about a dozen high-ranking military officers, several senior executives of state-owned companies, and five national leaders (list). More than 100,000 people have been indicted for corruption. The campaign is part of a much wider drive to clean up malfeasance within party ranks and shore up party unity. It has become an emblematic feature of Xi Jinping's political brand.

Executed largely under the direction of the Central Commission for Discipline Inspection (CCDI) and its Secretary from 2012 to 2017 Wang Qishan along with corresponding military and judicial organs, the campaign was notable in implicating both incumbent and former national-level leaders, including former Politburo Standing Committee (PSC) member Zhou Yongkang and former Central Military Commission (CMC) vice-chairmen Xu Caihou and Guo Boxiong. Such investigations broke the unspoken rule regarding 'PSC criminal immunity' that has been the norm since the end of the Cultural Revolution.

Campaign oversight 

The agency directly charged with overseeing the campaign is the CCDI, which, at the time of the campaign, was headed by Secretary Wang Qishan, a politician known for his work in the financial sector and one of the seven members of the CCP Politburo Standing Committee. Wang was in charge of the day-to-day execution of the campaign. The CCDI's official mandate is to enforce party discipline, combat malfeasance, and punish party members for committing offenses. The CCDI is an internal agency of the party and therefore does not have judicial authority. In general, the CCDI investigates officials and, when necessary, forwards evidence gathered to judicial organs, such as the Supreme People's Procuratorate (in charge of investigation and prosecution), who proceeds to charge the accused with criminal wrongdoing and move the case to trial.

While the CCDI formally reports into the Party Congress, nominally the highest representative body of the party which gathers once every five years, and is intended to be an 'independent' agency from a constitutional standpoint, in practice ultimate oversight of the agency falls under the purview of Xi Jinping by virtue of holding the office of General Secretary (i.e., de facto leader). Xi, who also directs anti-graft efforts of the military through his holding the office of Chairman of the Central Military Commission (i.e., commander-in-chief). The majority of reporting on the campaign by media sources have highlighted Xi Jinping's direct involvement in managing the campaign, which has become a central hallmark of his term in office. However, formal disciplinary measures meted out to high-ranking officials such as former Politburo members must undergo ratification by the sitting Politburo.

The power of anticorruption is centralized to the CCP Politburo Standing Committee by undermining the original functions of the local Discipline Inspection Commissions. Coordination of anti-corruption efforts in the provinces and state-owned enterprises have been carried out by "central inspection teams", which reports to the Central Leading Group for Inspection Work, which like the CCDI is also led by Wang Qishan. The inspection teams are typically 'stationed' for a few months at the organization they were tasked with overseeing, and are in charge of thorough audits into the conduct of officials and organizational practices. The inspection teams send the results of the audits to the CCDI to enact formal investigative procedures such as Shuanggui (the practice of detaining individual party members for investigation).

The proposed constitutional changes published on February 25 envision the creation of a new anti-graft state agency that merges the Central Commission for Discipline Inspection and various anti-corruption government departments. The thus formed National Supervisory Commission will be the highest supervisory body in the country, and will be a cabinet-level organization outranking courts and the office of the prosecutor.

Chronology

Background

Anti-corruption efforts have been on the agenda of successive Chinese leaders, though the effectiveness of these campaigns have varied. Since economic reforms began in 1978, political corruption in China has grown significantly. The types of offenses vary, though usually they involve trading bribes for political favours, such as local businesses trying to secure large government contracts or subordinates seeking promotions for higher office.

At the 18th Party Congress, both outgoing General Secretary Hu Jintao and incoming party leader Xi Jinping repeatedly emphasized corruption is a threat to the party's survival. Xi made special mention of corruption in his inaugural speech as General Secretary on November 15, 2012. In his first days in office, Xi vowed to crack down on "tigers and flies", that is, high-ranking officials and petty civil servants alike. He also warned his colleagues on the Politburo that corruption would "doom the party and state."

First regional inspections
The first salvos of the campaign was the abrupt sacking of Sichuan Deputy Party Secretary Li Chuncheng, which took place in December 2012, shortly after Xi took office as leader of the CCP. The first batch of central inspection teams were dispatched in the third quarter of 2013 to various Chinese provinces, including Jiangxi, Inner Mongolia, Chongqing, and Hubei. A handful of provincial-level officials were investigated for corruption and removed from office as a result of the first round of inspection work. Of these regions, the inspection team in charge of Jiangxi uncovered far-reaching official corruption in the province, bringing down about a dozen officials, including Lieutenant Governor Yao Mugen. The inspection work in Hubei province also resulted in about a dozen cases, including that of Lieutenant Governor Guo Youming. In Inner Mongolia, head of the party's regional United Front department Wang Suyi was detained.

'Encircling' Zhou Yongkang

Meanwhile, in the latter half of 2013, a separate operation began to investigate officials with connections to Zhou Yongkang, former Politburo Standing Committee member and national security chief. Three sectors in which Zhou was known to carry immense influence were targeted for investigation, including the national oil sector (where Zhou was once a chief executive), Sichuan province (where Zhou was party chief), and security organs (once under the jurisdiction of the Central Political and Legal Affairs Commission, which Zhou headed). Senior officials, such as former China Petroleum chief executive Jiang Jiemin, senior Sichuan officials Li Chongxi and Guo Yongxiang, and former deputy minister of public security Li Dongsheng were all dismissed in 2013. Many of Zhou's former secretaries who later received promotions, including Ji Wenlin, Tan Li, Shen Dingcheng, and Li Hualin, were also rounded up for investigation.

The fall of Jiang Jiemin – who was seen as a close confidant of Zhou Yongkang and who also held membership on the elite Central Committee of the Chinese Communist Party – in September 2013 was seen as an unmistakable sign that the net was closing in on Zhou himself. On December 15, 2013, The New York Times, in a front-page article, confirmed that Zhou Yongkang was the ultimate target of the campaign, and that it would be only a matter of time before the investigation was made public. On January 30, 2014, Caixin, a Chinese website known for its investigative journalism, released a video and an accompanying article entitled "The Three 'White Gloves' of Zhou Bin", detailing allegations about the wrongdoing of Zhou Yongkang's son, without mentioning the senior Zhou directly as a means to skirt censorship rules.

Second regional rounds and Shanxi "political earthquake"

In November 2013, a second round of inspection teams were dispatched. These teams were sent to the provinces of Shanxi, Jilin, Yunnan, Anhui, Hunan and Guangdong, as well as the Xinhua News Agency, the Ministry of Commerce, and the state-owned company overseeing the construction of the Three Gorges Dam. In Guangdong, the inspections resulted in the abrupt downfall of the populist party chief of the provincial capital, Guangzhou, Wan Qingliang. In Yunnan, former provincial party chief Bai Enpei and Vice Governor Shen Peiping were implicated in corruption and detained.

In Shanxi, a coal-producing province in central China, the stationed inspection team picked up on a corruption labyrinth that seeped into almost all aspects of governance in the province, particularly the collusion between local politicians and business elites, most of whom ran coal companies. The inspection initially resulted in the dismissal of Deputy Party Secretary Jin Daoming, Vice Governor Du Shanxue, and Ling Zhengce, the brother of the once powerful chief presidential aide Ling Jihua.

The political drama in Shanxi played out over the third quarter of 2014, as the province experienced a wholesale cleansing of its political establishment with ferocity unseen in the post-Mao era China. Between August 23 and 29, 2014, four sitting members of the province's top governing council, the provincial Party Standing Committee, were sacked in quick succession, giving rise to what became known as the "great Shanxi political earthquake". The province's Party Secretary Yuan Chunqing was then abruptly transferred out of office, as the central authorities 'parachuted' then Jilin party chief Wang Rulin to take his place. During the transfer-of-power announcement in the provincial capital Taiyuan, Politburo Standing Committee member Liu Yunshan sat centre stage as party organization officials and provincial politicians ran the motions and exchanged obligatory political declarations to stabilize the province and maintain unwavering loyalty to the party centre.

Fall of the "Four Big Tigers"
As the public awaited word on the fate of Zhou Yongkang amid intense rumours circulating inside the country and in international media, on June 30, an announcement came from Beijing that General Xu Caihou, former member of the Politburo and vice chairman of the Central Military Commission from 2004 to 2013, was being expelled from the party for taking bribes in exchange for promotions, and facing criminal prosecution. The CMC Vice-chairman position is the highest position held by a military officer in China, as the chairmanship (commander-in-chief) is customarily occupied by a civilian. Xu was the highest-ranked PLA military officer ever to be implicated in corruption and the first Politburo member investigated for corruption since the sacking of former Chongqing party chief Bo Xilai. Unlike the steady build-up of speculation surrounding the Zhou case, the announcement of Xu's expulsion from the party came without any apparent warning. Reports later surfaced that the 71-year-old general, who was going through medical treatment for bladder cancer at 301 Military Hospital in Beijing, was taken from his sick bed in March 2014 to be investigated.

A month after Xu's fall, on July 30, 2014, state media finally broke months of silence on Zhou Yongkang with a press release naming him the subject of an investigation into "severe disciplinary violations". The terse news bulletin, carried throughout Chinese media, signalled that Zhou was "no longer a comrade" but did not discuss criminal wrongdoing. Zhou was likely placed under some form of house arrest long prior to the announcement. The official confirmation that Zhou was under investigation made him the first Politburo Standing Committee member to fall from grace since the end of the Cultural Revolution, and broke the unspoken rule of "PSC criminal immunity" that has been the norm for over three decades. Moreover, it was unusual that the case against Zhou was pursued despite his having retired from office in 2012. Prior to Xi's ascension to power, corruption cases were typically targeted towards incumbent Politburo members, such as Chen Xitong, Chen Liangyu, and Bo Xilai. Zhou would be formally expelled from the party in December 2014, after the Politburo reviewed findings of his case. The internal investigation concluded that Zhou abused his power, maintained extramarital affairs with multiple women, took massive bribes, exchanged money and favours for sex, and "leaked state and party secrets."

The fourth quarter of 2014 saw another flurry of officials detained for investigation. Criminal proceedings had also begun. On July 31, Wang Suyi was sentenced to fifteen years in prison for bribery. On August 5, Tong Mingqian was convicted of dereliction of duty in a vote-buying scandal and sentenced to five years in prison. In September 2014, the trial of former economic official Liu Tienan became the first high-profile televised trial of the campaign. On camera, a teary-eyed Liu recanted his crimes and lamented having ruined the future of his son, who was said to be complicit in his corrupt activities.

On December 22, 2014, Ling Jihua, former senior aide to former Party general secretary Hu Jintao and a political star whose ambitions were quashed by the untimely death of his Ferrari-driving son, also fell under the anti-graft dragnet. Ling was serving as the head of the party's United Front Work Department at the time, and also was vice chairman of the Chinese People's Political Consultative Conference (CPPCC), a legislative advisory body. Ling hailed from the prominent Linghu political family from Pinglu County, Shanxi. Several of his relatives were reported as having been investigated beginning in the third quarter of 2014, in what seemed to be another 'encirclement campaign' similar to what was happening with Zhou Yongkang. It was later alleged that Ling served as somewhat of a ringleader for the so-called Xishan Society, a secret society-like network of high officials from Shanxi province.

Su Rong, the fourth 'big tiger' who was then also serving as CPPCC Vice-chairman, was already 'netted' earlier in the year, but was officially expelled from the party in February 2015.  Su was better known for his lengthy career as party chief in three Chinese provinces, but his term in Jiangxi (2007 – 2013), where corruption was said to have flourished under his watch, was cited as the major reason for his downfall.

Regional profiles
Several provinces have faced the brunt of the anti-corruption campaign: Guangdong, Shanxi, Sichuan, and Jiangsu. In addition to tackling corruption, the campaign has also had the effect of reducing regional factionalism and dissecting entrenched patron-client networks that have flourished since the beginning of economic reforms in the 1980s. Xi Jinping had declared in his speeches that internal factionalism is as harmful to the party's ability to govern as corruption. As of November 2015, all 31 provincial-level divisions, including municipalities like Beijing and Shanghai, which were once considered to be relatively free of corruption, have seen at least one provincial-level official investigated for corruption.

Shanxi
Of the most heavily targeted provinces, Shanxi has been the most notable 'disaster zone', with a total of nine officials of provincial rank investigated or dismissed for corruption, five of which were sitting members of the provincial party standing committee, the province's highest de facto governing body.  At the time of the 18th Party Congress in November 2012, there were 13 seats on the provincial standing committee. By March 2015, less than a year after the "political earthquake", only three members of the original group remained, and only two members were born and raised in Shanxi province. The remainder have been removed from office, transferred out of the province, or otherwise replaced, indicating that the central authorities from Beijing had essentially 'taken over' political control of the province from Shanxi locals. Moreover, many municipal and local district leaders were also sacked and investigated for corruption in quick succession, such as in the cities of Datong, Lüliang, Yuncheng, Yangquan, and the provincial capital Taiyuan. According to official data, in 2013 alone, 26 officials of prefecture-department rank and 336 officials of county-division rank were disciplined in Shanxi province.

In 2014, 17 county-level party chiefs were investigated in Shanxi. The sheer extent of the 'damage' the campaign inflicted on Shanxi's political scene was so great and the changes so abrupt that some important posts were left vacant for nearly a year. The inspection teams in the province uncovered widespread collusion between those who hold political power and the "coal bosses" that stack their wallets in exchange for favourable treatment in approving development projects. Even officials who were previously seen as incorruptible eventually caved in to the systemic culture of graft.

Guangdong
In Guangdong, the campaign severely upset the political ecosystem that had long been dominated by native Cantonese politicians. Wan Qingliang, the popular and relatively youthful party chief of Guangzhou known for his frugality and accessibility, was sacked in the third quarter of 2014, and was also replaced by an outsider, former Tianjin vice mayor Ren Xuefeng. The province's top political advisor, Zhu Mingguo, also became one of the few incumbent officials of full provincial rank to be investigated for corruption. Lieutenant Governor Liu Zhigeng, another native Cantonese official who was once the party chief of Dongguan, and Zhuhai party chief Li Jia, who had spent his entire political career in Guangdong, were also sacked. The breaking down of local patronage networks had already begun before the 18th Party Congress, and continued with greater intensity following the Congress under newly anointed party chief Hu Chunhua. The party leadership team in Shenzhen, China's most successful Special Economic Zone, also underwent significant changes, with party chief Wang Rong moving to a provincial office; several of Wang's subordinates were investigated for corruption.

Yangtze River Delta
In Jiangsu, home province of former party leader Jiang Zemin and disgraced security chief Zhou Yongkang, several 'native sons' with seemingly promising political futures underwent investigation. Nanjing mayor Ji Jianye was the "first tiger" to fall in the province. His dismissal was trumpeted by the city's then party chief Yang Weize as having "removed a tumour" from the provincial capital. In January 2015, Yang himself was also detained for investigation. Former provincial party secretary-general Zhao Shaolin and Executive Vice Governor Li Yunfeng were also rounded up for investigation.

Zhejiang, 'home turf' of Party general secretary Xi Jinping and the site of much smaller-scale anti-corruption experimentation during Xi's term as party chief there, had been largely spared of high-profile political changes in the wake of the anti-corruption campaign. Whether this is because Xi instilled a puritan political culture in the province during his tenure there or because officials with patronage links to him were given favourable treatment was unclear. As of 2016, former provincial Party Standing Committee member Si Xinliang was the sole high official from the province to be investigated for disciplinary offenses.

Prevalence of party chiefs from provincial capitals
Notably, many of those investigated had served in the past as Party Chiefs of provincial capitals, making the position especially 'susceptible' for investigation. For example, Taiyuan (Chen Chuanping, Shen Weichen), Nanning (Yu Yuanhui), Jinan (Wang Min), Guangzhou (Wan Qingliang), Nanjing (Yang Weize), Xining (Mao Xiaobing), Urumqi (Li Zhi), Lanzhou (Lu Wucheng), Kunming (Qiu He, Zhang Tianxin, Gao Jinsong), and Chengdu (Li Chuncheng).

Critical analysis
Reaction to the campaign has been mixed. It is believed to enjoy popular support among most ordinary Chinese, but has raised some concerns in the country's legal community. Much of the press coverage surrounding the campaign has included speculation over its aims and the political and economic effects of the campaign.  Other observers have noted that the campaign takes place outside of the framework of legal due process, and that the campaign addresses only the symptoms and not the systemic causes of the problem.

According to historian and sinologist Wang Gungwu, Xi Jingping inherited a political party that was faced with pervasive corruption and in danger of collapse. Xi and the new generational leaders aimed to eliminate corruption at the higher levels of the CCP because of their belief that only the party was capable of governing China, and that a collapse of the party would be disastrous for the Chinese people. Wang further adds, "Xi Jinping obviously believes that his anti-corruption campaign was vital to enable him to save the Party."

Political motives

"Purge" and "factional warfare" hypotheses
British news magazine The Economist wrote in its "Banyan" column, "it is hard not to see corruption allegations as the latter-day weapon of choice in the winner-takes-all power struggles that the party has always suffered". Meanwhile, He Pin, editor at overseas Chinese news portal Boxun, likened Zhou Yongkang, Bo Xilai, Ling Jihua, and Xu Caihou, to a latter-day "Gang of Four", whose real crime was not corruption but conspiring to usurp power. Chinese writer Murong Xuecun, a continual critic of the CCP, wrote in an opinion article "In my view, Xi's anti-corruption campaign looks more like a Stalinist political purge... he relies on the regulations of the party and not on the laws of the state, the people carrying it out operate like the KGB, and most cases cannot be reported on with any transparency."

Factional struggle has been proposed as another explanation. The Economist cited a study by an Australian scholar which concluded that no Princelings, or descendants of the early Communist revolutionaries otherwise known as the "red second generation", have been targets of the anti-corruption campaign. Xi himself is considered a princeling; some also consider CCDI chief Wang Qishan a princeling through his father-in-law. However, the cohesiveness of the princelings as a political faction with similar policy preferences has not been well established. Indeed, just prior to Xi's ascension to power, Bo Xilai, arguably China's most high-profile princeling, was ousted from office as party chief of Chongqing and member of the Politburo. At the same time, between 2013 and 2015, almost all the high-level officials investigated or removed from office were from 'commoner' backgrounds, most of them farmers.

"Reducing elder influence" and "institution-building" theories
Other observers acknowledge the campaign may be intended to achieve political ends but depict its ultimate aims as something far less sinister. Li Weidong, former editor of the Reform magazine in China, told Voice of America that by signalling that no one is off limits and by targeting retired officials, the campaign aimed to reduce the undue influence of party "elders" who were no longer in office but nevertheless wanted to interfere in political affairs. Writing for Radio Free Asia, Liu Qing, among others, suggest that the campaign's main aim was to extinguish vestiges of influence of former Party general secretary Jiang Zemin.

Jiang's time in power saw a marked increase in patronage appointments that spanned the military, the provinces, and the party apparatus. Patron-client relationships, rather than merit, became the primary factor in securing promotions, giving rise to the formation of internal factions based on personal loyalty. Prominent examples of factions identified by observers include Jiang's Shanghai clique, Zhou Yongkang's spheres of influence in the state oil and public security sectors, and the so-called Xishan Society of Shanxi officials – apart from these well-known cases, political factionalism seemed to be the order of the day down to the lowest levels of party bureaucracy. This meant that factional patrons often exerted massive influence through informal channels rather than through the offices they hold. Indeed, the refusal of Jiang Zemin to relinquish his influence years after he had formally left office was said to have caused much unease with the party rank-and-file. It also had unduly constrained the ability of his successor Hu Jintao to enact systemic reforms or to carry out a cohesive agenda. By reversing this part of Jiang's legacy, some observers believe, Xi would be better equipped to discipline and unite the party under a common agenda. Proponents of this view believe that the ultimate aim of the campaign is to strengthen the role of institutions and stamp out factionalism and networks of personal loyalty, thereby creating a more united and meritocratic organization and achieving greater efficiency for governance.

"Positive change" hypothesis
Several Chinese-language media sources rejected the notion that the corruption campaign should be likened to a political purge, calling this view naive and overly cynical. Duowei wrote that the campaign is part of a wider agenda of systemic reform aimed at restoring legitimacy of the CCP's mandate to rule, which – in the decades immediately prior – was heavily challenged by widespread corruption, a widening gap between rich and poor, social injustice, and excessive focus on material wealth. In this view, the campaign is consistent to the other initiatives focused on social justice undertaken by Xi, including pushing ahead legal reform, abolishing re-education through labour, and castigating local officials from meddling in judicial proceedings.  Moreover, many officials implicated in the campaign were long retired or no longer serving in influential roles, and therefore posed no direct political threats to the incumbent administration.  Chinese sociologist Hu Xingdou told Deutsche Welle that the campaign was only the first stage of a long-term strategy aimed at genuinely tackling corruption and speculated that the second stage will include the establishment of independent anti-corruption organs.

Brookings Institution China scholar Cheng Li asserted that attributing ulterior motives to the campaign was not only wholly misleading but also unproductive. Li believes that not only has Xi's campaign had the effect of truly curbing corrupt practices at all levels of government, it has also restored public confidence in the CCP's mandate to rule, and has also returned massive ill-gotten gains back into state coffers which could be re-directed towards economic development. Li also refuted the "political purge" and "factional warfare" hypotheses, contending that Xi's main patrons were Jiang and Jiang's ally Zeng Qinghong, yet major targets of the campaign such as Xu Caihou, Zhou Yongkang and Liu Zhijun were in Jiang's camp, while others affiliated to the purged officials remain in office. His anti-corruption drive has widespread consensus in the party.

The BBC's Jonathan Fenby, among others, believe that the campaign may also be motivated by economic rather than political goals. For example, by tackling graft in state-owned enterprises, seen as bastions of entitlement, entrenched vested interests, and glaring inefficiencies, the government is better able to pursue economic reform programs aimed at liberalizing markets, breaking up monopolies, and reducing state control. Hu Xingdou also suggested the campaign has helped Xi conduct some much-needed "clean-up" of entrenched vested interests before pushing ahead with much larger structural reforms.

Counterintelligence rationale 
A December 2020 article in Foreign Policy suggested that decades of corruption inside of the CCP had created vulnerabilities exploited by outside intelligence agencies, particularly the Central Intelligence Agency. Purges under the guise of anti-corruption were at least partially motivated by counterintelligence concerns. Further reporting by Axios also revealed that years of corruption from the Hu-Wen era had left the CCP vulnerable to infiltration after Chinese officials discovered that the U.S. intelligence agencies were allegedly paying "promotion fees" for certain government officials; simultaneous to the anti-corruption drive beginning 2013, dozens of U.S. intelligence assets within China were reportedly executed and arrested.

Due process
Investigations by the party's disciplinary bodies are not part of the state judicial system. When an official is detained for an investigation, known as Shuanggui, they are essentially placed under house arrest and are isolated from the outside world. The subject often must endure days of grueling interrogation. Data from the first half of 2014 showed that the conviction rate of those who were investigated in that time period to be around 99%. The CCDI and its local counterparts usually gather evidence covertly well in advance of detaining the subject. Generally, when an official is announced to be under investigation, the CCDI has already collected an overwhelming amount of hard evidence. China scholar Willy Lam also wrote that the CCDI has seen a massive expansion of its powers since Xi's ascension, and that it was increasingly involved in the governance of the state. Lam also contended that the CCDI seemed to be deriving most of its power from Xi Jinping personally.

Conversely, state media and some observers have pointed out that the CCDI has undergone significant structural reform in recent years aimed at making anti-corruption efforts more depoliticized, rules-based, and process-oriented. For much of its history the CCDI has been seen as a body that is largely inept at fighting corruption, but during the term of Hu Jintao the organization began a series of reforms strengthening its independence. Upon Xi's assuming the party leadership, further reforms were enacted to make the CCDI a bona fide control and auditing organization governed by a sophisticated set of rules and regulations to ensure professionalism and procedural fairness.  Under Xi, the CCDI became much less likely to face interference from local barons and vested interests in performing its duties. It has also strengthened internal regulations on the manner in which investigations are to be conducted, to ensure that CCDI officials themselves do not abuse their power and break the very same rules they are tasked with enforcing.

Public perception
There was some initial cynicism among the Chinese public about the intent of the campaign and its effectiveness. Earlier on, domestic and international observers commented on the possibility that the campaign is an emblematic feature of Chinese political culture which has, since its imperial days, invariably attempted tackling corruption in a high-profile manner when a new leader comes to power. The 2014 ranking of countries by Transparency International's Corruption Perceptions Index ranked China lower than a year before, falling to 100th from 80th place. However, the extent and reach of the campaign has surprised even the most seasoned Chinese political observers.

There is a general consensus in the Chinese legal community that the endemic corruption is caused by the lack of an independent judiciary and a failure to enforce laws and regulations. They contend that these problems will not be permanently fixed until much deeper systemic problems are addressed. Guanxi and other social customs, may have also contributed to the prevalence of practices seen as corrupt from a strictly legal perspective but seem relatively benign from a cultural standpoint. Gift-giving during holidays, securing patrons for career advancement, hosting banquets at expensive restaurants to secure minor deals, exchanging favours, and navigating the complex web of guanxi to get things done was seen as an ordinary part of Chinese life. Indeed, many people did not see these activities as illegal or even morally problematic.  Moreover, many regulations and law governing cadre work and public service were rarely enforced, resulting in two prevailing winds among Chinese officialdom that "if everyone else is doing it then it must be okay," and that "I probably won't ever be caught anyway".

Following the announcement of the campaign, former premier Zhu Rongji made a rare public statement voicing support for the campaign.

Analysis of effects 
A 2022 study by researchers at the University of Navarra and the University of Manchester suggested that economic corruption (indexed by the greater success of private firms with political connections) increased during the Xi Jinping administration.

List of implicated officials

See also 

 Operation Fox Hunt
 Chinese police overseas service stations

References 

Chinese Communist Party
History of the People's Republic of China
Socialism in China
2010s in China
Campaigns of the Chinese Communist Party
Corruption in China